The 1946 Missouri Tigers football team was an American football team that represented the University of Missouri in the Big Six Conference (Big 6) during the 1946 college football season. The team compiled a 5–4–1 record (3–2 against Big 6 opponents), finished in a tie for third place in the Big 6, and was outscored by all opponents by a combined total of 166 to 158. 

After three years of wartime service in the United States Navy, Don Faurot returned as the team's head coach in 1946. The 1946 season was Faurot's ninth of 19 seasons as head coach of the Missouri football team.

Seven Oklahoma players received honors from the Associated Press (AP) or United Press (UP) on the 1946 All-Big Six Conference football team: back Lloyd Brinkman (AP-1, UP-1); end Roland Oakes (AP-1, UP-1); tackle Jim Kekeris (AP-1, UP-1); back Bob Hopkins (AP-2, UP-2); center Ralph Stewart (AP-2, UP-2); end Marshall Shurnas (UP-3); and guard Verlie Abrams (UP-3). 

The team's leading scorers were Howard Bonnett and Loyd Brinkman, each with 30 points.

The team played its home games at Memorial Stadium in Columbia, Missouri.

Schedule

1947 NFL Draft

The 1947 NFL Draft was held on December 16, 1946. The following Tigers were selected.

References

Missouri
Missouri Tigers football seasons
Missouri Tigers football